Martha Raye (born Margy Reed; August 27, 1916 – October 19, 1994), nicknamed The Big Mouth, was an American comic actress and singer who performed in movies, and later on television. She also acted in plays, including Broadway.
She was honored in 1969 at the Academy Awards as the Jean Hersholt Humanitarian Award recipient for her volunteer efforts and services to the troops.

Early years
Raye's life as a singer and comedic performer began in very early childhood. She was born at St. James Hospital in Butte, Montana, as Margy Reed; despite her birth certificate showing Reed, some sources in the 1970s and 1980s gave her the surname O'Reed.

Her father, Peter F. Reed Jr., was an Irish immigrant; her mother, Maybelle Hazel (Hooper) Reed, was raised in Milwaukee and Montana. Her parents were performing in a local vaudeville theatre as Reed and Hooper when their daughter was born. Two days later, her mother was performing again. Martha first appeared in their act when she was three years old. She later performed with her brother Bud, and the children became so popular that their parents' act was renamed Margie and Bud.

Career
In the early 1930s, Raye was a band vocalist with the Paul Ash and Boris Morros orchestras. She made her first film appearance in 1934 in a band short titled A Nite in the Nite Club. In 1936, she was signed for comic roles by Paramount Pictures, and made her first picture for Paramount. Her first feature film was Rhythm on the Range with crooner Bing Crosby. She made her Broadway debut in the Harry Akst musical Calling All Stars in 1934, and later returned to Broadway in starring roles in Yip Harburg's Hold On to Your Hats (1941, as Marnie), Jerry Herman's Hello, Dolly! (1967, as Dolly), and Vincent Youmans's No, No, Nanette (1972, as Pauline). 

From 1936–1939, she was a featured cast member in 39 episodes of Al Jolson's weekly CBS radio show, The Lifebuoy Program, also called Cafe Trocadero. In addition to comedy, Raye sang both solos and duets with Jolson. Over the next quarter century, she would appear with many of the leading comics of her day, including Joe E. Brown, Bob Hope, W. C. Fields, Abbott and Costello (in Keep 'Em Flying), Charlie Chaplin (in Monsieur Verdoux), and Jimmy Durante. She joined the USO in 1942, soon after the US entered World War II.

She was known for the size of her mouth, which was large in proportion to her face, earning her the nickname The Big Mouth. She later referred to this in a series of television commercials for Polident denture cleaner in the 1980s: "So take it from The Big Mouth: new Polident Green gets tough stains clean!" Her large mouth would relegate her motion picture work to supporting comic parts, and was often made up so it appeared even larger. In the Disney cartoon Mother Goose Goes Hollywood, she is caricatured while dancing alongside Joe E. Brown, another actor known for a big mouth. In the Warner Bros. cartoon The Woods Are Full of Cuckoos (1937), she was caricatured as a jazzy scat-singing donkey named 'Moutha Bray'.

In 1968, she was awarded the Jean Hersholt Humanitarian Award in the form of an Oscar. After her death the statuette was displayed for many years in a specially constructed lighted niche at the Friars Club in Beverly Hills. On November 2, 1993, she was awarded the Presidential Medal of Freedom by President Bill Clinton for her service to her country. The citation reads:

A talented performer whose career spans the better part of a century, Martha Raye has delighted audiences and uplifted spirits around the globe. She brought her tremendous comedic and musical skills to her work in film, stage, and television, helping to shape American entertainment. The great courage, kindness, and patriotism she showed in her many tours during World War II, the Korean War, and the Vietnam War earned her the nickname 'Colonel Maggie'. The American people honor Martha Raye, a woman who has tirelessly used her gifts to benefit the lives of her fellow Americans.

Television career
She was a television star very early in its history. She starred in the short-lived (28 episodes) The Martha Raye Show (1954–1956), opposite retired middleweight boxer Rocky Graziano, who played her boyfriend. (Raye was known to call Graziano "goombah", the Sicilian abbreviation of the Italian 'compáré' ('cumpari' in Southern Italian) - friend, comrade.)  The writer and producer was future The Phil Silvers Show creator Nat Hiken.

Some of the guest stars on the show were Zsa Zsa Gabor, Cesar Romero, and Broadway dancer Wayne Lamb. She also appeared on other TV shows in the 1950s, such as What's My Line?

Following the demise of her TV variety show, the breakup of her fifth marriage, and a series of other personal and health problems, she attempted suicide by overdosing on sleeping pills on August 14, 1956. Well-wishers gave her a St. Christopher's medal, a St. Genesius medal, and a Star of David. After her recovery, she wore these amulets faithfully, although she was neither Catholic nor Jewish. At the conclusion of each episode of her TV shows, she would thank the nuns at the Sisters of St. Francis Hospital in Miami, Florida, where she had recovered. She always said "Goodnight, Sisters" as a sign of appreciation and gratitude.

Later in her career, she made television commercials for Polident denture cleanser, principally during the 1970s and 1980s.

Later career
In 1970, she portrayed Boss Witch, the "Queen of all Witchdom", in the feature film Pufnstuf for Sid and Marty Krofft. This led to her being cast as villainess Benita Bizarre in The Bugaloos (1970), which the Kroffts produced the same year.

She often appeared as a guest on other programs, particularly those which often featured older performers as guest stars, such as ABC's The Love Boat, and also on variety programs, including the short-lived The Roy Rogers and Dale Evans Show. She appeared from the third to the ninth seasons as Carrie Sharples, Mel's mother on Alice, making two or three appearances a season. She made guest appearances or did cameo roles in such series as Murder, She Wrote on CBS and The Andy Williams Show and McMillan & Wife, both on NBC. She appeared again as Agatha for the six-episode run of the retooled McMillan, taking over for Nancy Walker, who had left the series. Her last film appearance was as an incontinent airline passenger in the disaster film The Concorde ... Airport '79 (1979).

Personal life
Raye's personal life was complex and emotionally tumultuous. She was married seven times.

Raye was a devout Methodist. She regularly attended church, read the Bible daily, and taught Sunday school. Because her religious views were often misconstrued, she said, "One paper says I'm Catholic and the other says I'm Jewish. I guess that's fitting because, as a Methodist, I'm meant to be undetermined some of the time".

Her engagement to orchestra leader Johnny Torrence was announced in June 1936. Less than two months later she commented, "They tell me I've gone Hollywood already because I got engaged to Johnny Torrence one day and broke it off the next."

She was married to make-up artist Hamilton "Buddy" Westmore from May 30, 1937, until September 1937, filing for divorce on the basis of extreme cruelty; to composer-conductor David Rose from October 8, 1938, to May 19, 1941; to Neal Lang from May 25, 1941, to February 3, 1944; to Nick Condos from February 22, 1944, to June 17, 1953; to Edward T. Begley from April 21, 1954, to October 6, 1956; to Robert O'Shea from November 7, 1956, to December 1, 1960; and to Mark Harris from September 25, 1991, until her death in 1994. She had one child, a daughter, Melodye Condos (born July 26, 1944), with her fourth husband, Nick Condos.

Politically, Raye was conservative, affirming her political views by informing an interviewer in 1984, "I believe in the constitution, strength in national defense, limited government, individual freedom, and personal responsibility. They reinforce the resolve the United States is the greatest country in the world and we can all be eternally grateful to our founding fathers for the beautiful legacy they left us."

Death
Raye's final years were plagued by ill health. She had a history of cardiovascular disease and suffered from Alzheimer's disease, in addition to losing both legs in 1993 due to poor circulation. While resting in the hospital-type bed in her home, she and her husband Mark Harris (who, because of their controversial May/December relationship, became a frequent guest on the popular Howard Stern radio program) were forced to move into a hotel after their house was destroyed in the 1994 Northridge earthquake. Raye died at age 78 of pneumonia on October 19, 1994.

Appreciation of her work with the USO during World War II and subsequent wars led to her being named both an honorary colonel in the U.S. Marines and an honorary lieutenant colonel in the U.S. Army, and earned special consideration to be buried in Arlington National Cemetery. Upon her death it was instead requested that she be buried with full military honors in the Fort Bragg Main Post cemetery at Spring Lake, North Carolina, home of her loving and beloved United States Army Special Forces; the Fifth Special Forces Group (Airborne) made her an honorary Green Beret for her USO work in Vietnam.

Raye has two stars on the Hollywood Walk of Fame—one for motion pictures at 6251 Hollywood Boulevard and the other for television at 6547 Hollywood Blvd.

Archive
The moving image collection of Martha Raye is held at the Academy Film Archive. The collection consists of an audio tape and home movies.

Filmography

Film

 A Nite in a Nite Club (1934, Short) – Herself – Singer
 Rhythm on the Range (1936) – Emma Mazda
 The Big Broadcast of 1937 (1936) – Patsy
 Hideaway Girl (1936) – Helen Flint
 College Holiday (1936) – Daisy Schloggenheimer
 Waikiki Wedding (1937) – Myrtle Finch
 Mountain Music (1937) – Mary Beamish
 Artists & Models (1937) – Specialty
 Double or Nothing (1937) – Liza Lou Lane
 Cinema Circus (1937) – Herself (archive footage)
 The Big Broadcast of 1938 (1938) – Martha Bellows
 College Swing (1938) – Mabel Grady
 Tropic Holiday (1938) – Midge Miller
 Give Me a Sailor (1938) – Letty Larkin
 Never Say Die (1939) – Mickey Hawkins

 $1,000 a Touchdown (1939) – Martha Madison
 The Farmer's Daughter (1940) – Patience Bingham
 The Boys from Syracuse (1940) – Luce
 Navy Blues (1941) – Lilibelle Bolton
 Keep 'Em Flying (1941) – Gloria Phelps / Barbara Phelps
 Hellzapoppin' (1941) – Betty Johnson
 Four Jills in a Jeep (1944) – Martha Raye
 Pin Up Girl (1944) – Molly McKay
 Monsieur Verdoux (1947) – Annabella Bonheur
 Billy Rose's Jumbo (1962) – Lulu
 No Substitute for Victory (1970, Documentary) – Herself
 The Phynx (1970) – Foxy
 Pufnstuf (1970) – Boss Witch
 The Concorde ... Airport '79 (1979) – Loretta

Television
 Four Star Revue (host from 1951–1953) – Herself
 The Martha Raye Show (1954–1956) – Herself
 What's My Line? (mystery guest December 11, 1955) – Herself
 Club Oasis (1958) – Herself
 The Roy Rogers and Dale Evans Show (episode "Circus", December 8, 1962) – Herself
 The Red Skelton Show (1963) – Herself
 The Judy Garland Show (1964) – Herself
 Password (March 25, 1965) - Herself
 The Hollywood Palace (April 2, 1966) – Herself
 The Carol Burnett Show (1967, 1969,1970) – Herself
 The Bugaloos (1970–1972) – Benita Bizarre
 McMillan (1976–1977) – Agatha
 'Twas the Night Before Christmas (1977, TV special) – Nellie's mother
 Skinflint: A Country Christmas Carol (1979, TV movie) – Ghost of Christmas Past
 Alice (1979–1984) – Carrie Sharples
 The Gossip Columnist (1980, TV movie) – Georgia O'Hanlon
 Pippin: His Life and Times (1981, TV movie) – Berthe
 Murder, She Wrote (1985) – Sadie Winthrope
 Alice in Wonderland (1985, TV movie) – The Duchess (final film role)

Stage work
 Calling All Stars (1934)
 Hold On to Your Hats (1940)
 Annie Get Your Gun (1951)
 Anything Goes (1958)
 Wildcat (1962)
 Call Me Madam (1963)
 The Solid Gold Cadillac (1964)
 Hello Dolly! (1967)
 Goodbye Charlie (1968)
 Hello, Sucker! (1969) (closed on the road)
 Everybody Loves Opal (1970; 1988)
 No, No, Nanette (1972) (replacement for Patsy Kelly)
 Pippin (1981)
 4 Girls 4 (1982)
 Annie (1983)
 The Prince of Central Park (1989) (replaced by Jo Anne Worley prior to opening)

References

External links

 
 
 
 
 All Star Revue episode guide at Classic TV Info.
 The Martha Raye Show episode guide at Classic TV Info.
 Vets tribute to Colonel Maggie with veteran pictures and stories.
 Truth or fiction report regarding her military honorary rank, medals and service as a military nurse.
 Martha Raye papers, 1916–2000, Margaret Herrick Library, Academy of Motion Picture Arts and Sciences

1916 births
1994 deaths
20th-century American actresses
20th-century American singers
20th-century American women singers
20th-century American comedians
American amputees
American Methodists
American women pop singers
American film actresses
American radio actresses
American stage actresses
American television actresses
American women comedians
American people of Irish descent
Actresses from Butte, Montana
Jean Hersholt Humanitarian Award winners
Screen Actors Guild Life Achievement Award
Military personnel from Montana
Traditional pop music singers
Vaudeville performers
Presidential Medal of Freedom recipients
Paramount Pictures contract players
California Republicans
Montana Republicans
Conservatism in the United States
People with Alzheimer's disease
Deaths from pneumonia in California
United Service Organizations entertainers